August Nybergh (20 August 1851 in Heinola – 5 December 1920 in Helsinki) was a Finnish jurist, senator in the Grand Duchy of Finland, Member of Parliament and the first president of the Supreme Court of Finland.

References 

 Wikisource (fi): Kuka kukin oli 1961
 Nybergh in a complete directory of all Finnish Members of Parliament (in Finnish)

External links 
 The biography of August Nybergh in the National Biography of Finland (in Finnish)

1851 births
1920 deaths
People from Heinola
People from Mikkeli Province (Grand Duchy of Finland)
Swedish-speaking Finns
Swedish People's Party of Finland politicians
Finnish senators
Members of the Diet of Finland
Members of the Parliament of Finland (1910–11)
Members of the Parliament of Finland (1911–13)
University of Helsinki alumni
19th-century Finnish people
20th-century judges